William Thomas Young (27 April 1870 – 20 September 1953) was a New Zealand seaman and trade unionist.

Biography
Young was born in Karori, Wellington, New Zealand in 1870. He married Margaret Anne Craig in 1906.

In 1918 he was nominated by the Painters Union for the Labour nomination in the Wellington South by-election, but was defeated by Bob Semple.
 
Young was a Labour Party candidate in several Wellington municipal elections in 1905, 1907, 1913, 1915, 1921, 1923,  1925 and 1927.

He died at Karori, Wellington.

References

1870 births
1953 deaths
New Zealand sailors
New Zealand trade unionists
People from Wellington City
Unsuccessful candidates in the 1908 New Zealand general election
Unsuccessful candidates in the 1911 New Zealand general election